Fernando Eid (born 20 June 1992) is a Bolivian journalist and media personality. He currently reports for the morning magazine Al Día and television station Bolivisión.

Career 
Eid began his career in media in 2009. At that time, he was a radio host on Bolivian stations such as Radio Disney, Radio Activa and Radio El Debe. He was in programs Tweeners (ATB), Chicostation (Unitel), El Mañanero, Pura Vida and Singing for a Dream (Red Uno), PAT News and Noticia De La Hora (RED PAT). Since September 2019 he has been the presenter of the magazine Al Día and Bolivisión.

References

Other websites 
 Fernando Eid on Twitter

1992 births
Bolivian television journalists
Living people